Boom is a Dutch surname meaning "tree". It and the form De Boom can be of metaphoric origin, indicating a robust person ("like a tree"). Alternatively it may be a shortened version of names like Van der Boom or Ten Boom, meaning from/at the tree, boom barrier or warp beam. "Boom" is also regularly chosen as a surname in stage names. People with the name include:

 Bert Boom (born 1938), Dutch track cyclist
 Boudewijn Karel Boom (1903–1980), Dutch botanist
 Claria Horn Boom (born 1969), American (Kentucky) judge
 Cornelis Boom (died 1579), Dutch landowner and shipbuilder
 Irma Boom (born 1960), Dutch graphic designer
 Karel Boom (1858-1939), Belgian painter
 Lars Boom (born 1985), Dutch racing cyclist
 Max de Boom (born 1996), Dutch football winger
  (1936–2011), Dutch-born Italian actor
  (born 1947), German Roman Catholic bishop
As a stage name
 Barry Boom (born 1960s), British reggae singer Paul Robinson
 Benny Boom (born 1971), American music video and film director Benny Douglas
 Dionté Boom (born 1991), American rapper-producer Ervin Dionté Harris
 Nando Boom (born 1960s), Panamanian singer Fernando Brown
 Paddy Boom (born 1968), American drummer Patrick Seacor
 Taka Boom (born 1954), American R&B singer Yvonne Stevens
Van Boom / Van den Boom / Van der Boom
 Herman van den Boom (born 1950), Belgian photographer
 Claire van der Boom (born 1983), Australian actress
 Jeroen van der Boom (born 1972), Dutch singer
  (1807–1872), Dutch-born Swedish pianist and composer 
 J Boom (born 1991), Canadian hip hop blues musician and producer

See also
 Ten Boom, three members of a Dutch family who helped save Jews during the Holocaust

References

Dutch-language surnames